Dane Ripper is an Australian Thoroughbred race horse. Trained by Bart Cummings, she is best known for her win in the 1997 Cox Plate when ridden by Damien Oliver.

See also

 List of millionaire racehorses in Australia

1993 racehorse births
Thoroughbred family 2-g
Racehorses bred in Australia
Racehorses trained in Australia
Cox Plate winners